These are the results of the men's K-2 1000 metres competition in canoeing at the 1948 Summer Olympics. The K-2 event is raced by two-man canoe sprint kayaks. Heats and final took place on August 12.

Medalists

Heats
The 16 teams first raced in two heats.  The top four teams in each heat advanced directly to the final.

No times were recorded in the second heat according to the official Olympic report.

Final

Blahó and Urányi were disqualified for "hanging" in the wake of another kayak.

References
1948 Summer Olympics official report. p. 315.
Sports-Reference.com 1948 K-2 1000 m results.
Wallechinsky, David and Jaime Loucky (2008). "Canoeing: Men's Kayak Pairs: 1000 Meters". In The Complete Book of the Olympics: 2008 Edition. London: Aurum Press, Limited. pp. 474–5.

Men's K-2 1000
Men's events at the 1948 Summer Olympics